Crittenden County Public Schools is a school district serving Crittenden County, Kentucky.  Communities served by the school district include Marion, Crayne, Dycusburg, Tolu and surrounding areas.  The school sports teams are called "Rockets".  All Crittenden County Schools are located in Marion.

Schools

Elementary school
Crittenden County Elementary School

Middle school
Crittenden County Middle School

High school
Crittenden County High School

External links
Crittenden County Schools

Education in Crittenden County, Kentucky
School districts in Kentucky